Yamashita (written:  lit. "under the mountain") is the 29th most common Japanese surname. Notable people with the surname include:

Akihiko Yamashita (born 1966), Japanese animator
Ayaka Yamashita (disambiguation), multiple people
Bruce Yamashita, U.S. military lawyer
, Japanese handball player
Yamashita Gentarō (Gentarō Yamashita) (1863–1931), Japanese admiral
Gota Yamashita (born 1989), Japanese mixed martial artist
Haruhiro Yamashita (born 1938), Japanese gymnast
, Japanese model and beauty pageant winner
, Japanese ice hockey player
Hiroko Yamashita (disambiguation), multiple people
Iris Yamashita, U.S. screenwriter
, Japanese sprinter
Karen Tei Yamashita (born 1951), Japanese-American writer
Keigo Yamashita (born 1978), Japanese Go player
Kazuhito Yamashita (born 1961), Japanese classical guitarist
Kinuyo Yamashita, Japanese composer
Kumi Yamashita (born 1968), artist
Kyle Yamashita (born 1959), American politician
Maki Yamashita (born 1974), Japanese pop musician
Michinori Yamashita (born 1953), Japanese mathematician
, Japanese rower
Mizuki Yamashita (born 1999), Japanese idol and actress
Norifumi Yamashita (born 1962), Japanese triple jumper
Reiko Yamashita (born 1973), Japanese pop musician
, Japanese painter
, Japanese footballer
Sachiko Yamashita (born 1964), Japanese long-distance runner
, Japanese swimmer
, Japanese ice hockey player
Yamashita Shintaro (山下新太郎, 1881-1966), Japanese painter
Stomu Yamashta or Yamashita Tsutomu (born 1947), Japanese percussionist, keyboardist and composer
Tadashi Yamashita (born 1942), Japanese-born American martial artist
Takuji Yamashita (1874-1959), Japanese-American civil rights pioneer
Tatsuro Yamashita  (born 1953), Japanese musician and record producer
Tokuo Yamashita (1919–2014), Japanese politician
Tomohisa Yamashita (born 1985), Japanese pop musician
, Japanese sport shooter
Tomoyuki Yamashita (1885-1946), Japanese general
Toru Yamashita (born 1988), Japanese guitarist 
Yasuhiro Yamashita (born 1957), Japanese judoka
Yoshiteru Yamashita (born 1977), Japanese footballer
Yamashita Yoshitsugu (1865-1935), Japanese Judo exponent
Yosuke Yamashita (born 1942), Japanese jazz musician
Sachio Yamashita, Japanese-American artist, abstract painter and muralist

Fictional characters
Mari Yamashita

See also
Yamashita Cave Man, human fossils found in Okinawa
Yamashita Station (disambiguation), several Japanese train stations
Yamashita's gold, a World War II treasure trove
The Yamashita Standard, a threshold for command responsibility in war crimes proceedings

References

Japanese-language surnames